Systemic design is an interdiscipline that joins systems thinking to design methodology, integrating systems thinking and human-centred design, with the intention of helping designers cope with complex design projects. 
The recent challenges to design coming from the increased complexity caused by globalization, migration, and sustainability render traditional design methods insufficient. Designers need better ways to design responsibly and avoid unintended side effects. 
Systemic design intends to develop methodologies and approaches that help to integrate systems thinking with design towards sustainability at the environmental, social and economic levels. It is a pluralistic initiative where many different approaches are encouraged to thrive and where dialogue and organic development of new practices are central.

The systemic design dialogue is driven by the Relating Systems Thinking and Design (RSD) Symposia resulting in published proceedings and several special issues on systemic design, for example in the scientific design research journals FORMakademisk and She Ji. In 2022 the Systemic Design Association launched its own journal called Contexts.

Academic groups
Systemic design is being developed within the design practice and through the Systemic Design Research Network, focusing on different aspects of the issue. Different academic groups have been facing Systemic Design both in their teaching and researching activities:
  Systems oriented design is an example of a systemic design approach being used at the Oslo School of Architecture and Design. Systems Oriented Design seeks to train the designers ability to cope with a larger degree of complexity and to take more responsibility for the consequences of their actions. Holistic perspectives, ethics and sustainability as well as cultural, organizational, economic, and technical considerations are central.
 At Politecnico di Torino, the Master of Science in Systemic Design is active and it is named after Aurelio Peccei, in that place didactics and research are growing up together. This approach, put forward by Luigi Bistagnino, focuses on the relationship between the inputs and the outputs of a system, by viewing waste as a valuable resource. Research on Systemic Design at Politecnico di Torino is now led by Silvia Barbero.
 The Strategic Foresight and innovation master program at OCAD University  Toronto is a well known systemic design initiative led by Peter H. Jones. Emphasis is placed on teaching complex problem finding, framing and solving, to envision and develop sustainable futures. 
 At the National Institute of Design (NID) India there is a group of academics at the design department, established by late Prof M.P. Ranjan and now led by Praveen Nahar among many other faculty. Systems Thinking and Design is part of the academic programme at NID, it involves the application of the systems approach towards complex issues and wicked problems from socio-cultural-economic-environmental perspective with high level of ambiguity, uncertainty and complexity.
 Alex Ryan is leading a group of systemic designers at the Government of Alberta.   They combine systemic design and strategic foresight to redesign the policy development process in government.
 At the University of Montreal, the Master's degree in Applied Science in Design, Design and Complexity (DESCO)  track focuses on design activities and aims to train students in complex thinking, so as to prepare them to act and think as true integrators, in contexts that are increasingly complex. Areas of focus include: sustainable design and eco-design, social design, project management, digital design, new technologies, innovation, strategic design, game design, interaction design, service design, experience design and collaborative design.

History

From complexity theories to systemic design 

The theories about complexity help the management of an entire system and the suggested design approaches help the planning of different divergent elements. The complexity theories evolved on the basis that living systems continually draw upon external sources of energy and maintain a stable state of low entropy, on the basis of the General Systems Theory by Karl Ludwig von Bertalanffy (1968). Some of the next rationales applied those theories also on artificial systems: complexity models of living systems address also productive models with their organizations and management, where the relationships between parts are more important than the parts themselves. Treating productive organizations as complex adaptive systems allows a new management model to emerge in economical, social and environmental benefits (Pisek and Wilson, 2001 ). In that field, Cluster Theory (Porter, 1990 ) evolved in more environmentally sensitive theories, like Industrial Ecology (Frosh and Gallopoulos, 1989 ) and Industrial Symbiosis (Chertow, 2000). 
In 1994, Gunter Pauli and Heitor Gurgulino de Souza founded the research institute Zero Emission Research and Initiatives (ZERI), starting from the idea that progress should embed respect for the environment and natural techniques that will allow production processes to be part of the ecosystem.
The design thinking, as Buchanan (1992) said, means the way to creatively and strategically reconfigure a design concept on a situation with systemic integration. This needs a strong inter- and trans-disciplinarity during the design phase (Fuller, 1981 ), with the increasing involvement of different disciplines including urban planning, public policy, business management and environmental sciences (Chertow et al., 2004 ). Systems and complexity theories and design thinking redesign a pretty new discipline: the Systemic Design, which is located as a human-centred systems-oriented design practice (Bistagnino, 2011; Sevaldson, 2011; Nelson and Stolterman, 2012; Jones, 2014; Toso at al., 2012 ).

Systemic design today 

The contemporary debate on Systemic design started with the Relating Systems Thinking and Design Symposia series (RSD)    on the initiative of Birger Sevaldson at the Oslo School of Architecture and Design in 2012. Amongst the invited participants were Harold G. Nelson, Peter H. Jones and Alex Ryan. An initial meeting was held in Oslo to consolidate the possibility of building a future network. Other participants were Michael Hensel, Colleen Ponto and others. The RSD seminars started in the context of Systems Oriented Design (SOD). In 2013-14 a discussion was initiated by Birger Sevaldson questioning the framework of the new emerging network. The network changed its name to Systemic Design allowing it to grow more pluralistically while SOD could develop more specially. The Systemic Design Research Network was founded shortly after on the initiative of Peter H. Jones and with Harold Nelson, Alex Ryan and Birger Sevaldson as co-founders.

In recent years, numerous design projects have adopted a systemic approach. These focused on diverse topics including – but not limited to – food networks, industrial processes and water purification, revitalization of internal areas through art and tourism  and circular economy, exhibition and fairs, social inclusion and marginalization.

Background
Systems thinking in design has a long history with people like Christpher Alexander, Horst Rittel,  Russl Ackoff, Bela Banathy, Ranulph Glanville, M.P.Ranjan, Harold Nelson and others. Also the main systems theories and models were known and applied in design since their beginning. Despite this Systems Thinking has never become mainstream in design. The reasons for this might be that the prescribed techniques and approaches were too technical and did not fit well to an organic design process.

The systemic design initiative is addressing this problem by seeking new connections and relations between systems thinking and designerly ways of working.

References

External links
 Systemic Design overview

Design
Sys